The 1989–90 National Soccer League season, was the 14th season of the National Soccer League in Australia. The league was known as the Quit NSL under a sponsorship arrangement with the Victorian Health Promotion Foundation.

Regular season

League table

Finals series

Grand Final

Individual awards
Player of the Year: Zeljko Adzic (Melbourne Croatia)
U-21 Player of the Year: Paul Okon (Marconi Fairfield)
Top Scorer: David Seal (Sydney Croatia) - 15 goals
Coach of the Year: Bertie Mariani (Marconi Fairfield)

References

Other sources
Australia - List of final tables (RSSSF)
NSL awards at ozfootball.net

National Soccer League (Australia) seasons
1989 in Australian soccer
1990 in Australian soccer
Aus
Aus